Roger Coles (September 19, 1958 – June 24, 2013)  was a Canadian politician, who represented the electoral district of Tatchun in the Yukon Legislative Assembly from 1985 to 1986. He was a member of the Yukon Liberal Party, and the party's leader from 1984 to 1986. He subsequently resigned his seat in the legislature on October 31 after pleading guilty to cocaine trafficking, and was sentenced to three years in prison. After which, he moved to Drayton valley where he succeeded making a profitable business with Century 21 selling real estate. He was the Co-owner as well as the broker. 
He owned and built businesses in Drayton Valley such as the first Dairy Queen in the town, and a music store.He later moved to Drayton Valley, Alberta, where he served on the municipal council. Roger Coles raised his 4 children, which 3 have had offspring. He was an announcer for the Drayton Valley Thunder, the hockey team, for awhile. He died on June 24, 2013 in Drayton Valley. He is survived by his wife, 4 living children, 10 living grandchildren, and many, many friends.

References

1959 births
2013 deaths
Yukon Liberal Party MLAs
Alberta municipal councillors
Yukon Liberal Party leaders